Félix Lefebvre (born November 19, 1999) is a French actor. For his role as Alexis Robin in the dramatic film Summer of 85, he was nominated for the César Award for Best Young Actor in 2021.

Filmography

Film

Television

References

External links
 Instagram
 

1999 births
Living people
People from Saint-Maurice, Val-de-Marne
French male film actors
French male television actors
21st-century French male actors